37th London Film Critics Circle Awards
22 January 2017

Film of the Year: 
La La Land

British Film of the Year: 
I, Daniel Blake

The 37th London Film Critics' Circle Awards, honouring the best in film for 2016, were announced by the London Film Critics' Circle on 22 January 2017.

Winners and nominees

Film of the Year
La La Land
American Honey
Fire at Sea
I, Daniel Blake
Love & Friendship
Manchester by the Sea
Moonlight
Nocturnal Animals
Son of Saul
Toni Erdmann

Foreign Language Film of the Year
Toni Erdmann
Fire at Sea
Son of Saul
 Things to Come
 Victoria

British/Irish Film of the Year
I, Daniel Blake
American Honey
High-Rise
Love & Friendship
Sing Street

Documentary of the Year
Fire at Sea
The Beatles: Eight Days a Week – The Touring Years
Cameraperson
The Eagle Huntress
Life, Animated

Actor of the Year
Casey Affleck – Manchester by the Sea
Adam Driver – Paterson
Andrew Garfield – Hacksaw Ridge
Jake Gyllenhaal – Nocturnal Animals
Peter Simonischek – Toni Erdmann

Actress of the Year
Isabelle Huppert – Things to Come
Amy Adams – Arrival
Kate Beckinsale – Love & Friendship
Sandra Hüller – Toni Erdmann
Emma Stone – La La Land

Supporting Actor of the Year
Mahershala Ali – Moonlight
Tom Bennett – Love & Friendship
Jeff Bridges – Hell or High Water
Shia LaBeouf – American Honey
Michael Shannon – Nocturnal Animals

Supporting Actress of the Year
Naomie Harris – Moonlight
Viola Davis – Fences
Greta Gerwig – 20th Century Women
Riley Keough – American Honey
Michelle Williams – Manchester by the Sea

British/Irish Actor of the Year
Andrew Garfield – Hacksaw Ridge and Silence
Tom Bennett – Love & Friendship and David Brent: Life on the Road
Hugh Grant – Florence Foster Jenkins
Dave Johns – I, Daniel Blake
David Oyelowo – A United Kingdom and Queen of Katwe

British/Irish Actress of the Year
Kate Beckinsale – Love & Friendship
Rebecca Hall – Christine
Naomie Harris – Moonlight, Our Kind of Traitor, and Collateral Beauty
Ruth Negga – Loving and Iona
Hayley Squires – I, Daniel Blake

Young British/Irish Performer of the Year
Lewis MacDougall – A Monster Calls
Ruby Barnhill – The BFG
Sennia Nanua – The Girl with All the Gifts
Anya Taylor-Joy – The Witch, Morgan, and Split
Ferdia Walsh-Peelo – Sing Street

Director of the Year
László Nemes – Son of Saul
Maren Ade – Toni Erdmann
Damien Chazelle – La La Land
Barry Jenkins – Moonlight
Kenneth Lonergan – Manchester by the Sea

Screenwriter of the Year
Kenneth Lonergan – Manchester by the Sea
Maren Ade – Toni Erdmann
Damien Chazelle – La La Land
Barry Jenkins – Moonlight
Whit Stillman – Love & Friendship

Breakthrough British/Irish Filmmaker
Babak Anvari – Under the Shadow
Mike Carey – The Girl with All the Gifts
Guy Hibbert – Eye in the Sky and A United Kingdom
Peter Middleton and James Spinney – Notes on Blindness
Rachel Tunnard – Adult Life Skills

British/Irish Short Film
Brady Hood – Sweet Maddie Stone
Duncan Cowles and Ross Hogg –Isabella
Rene Pannevis – Jacked
Sofia Safanova – Tamara
Natasha Waugh – Terminal

Technical Achievement
Victoria – Sturla Brandth Grøvlen, cinematography
American Honey – Robbie Ryan, cinematography
Arrival – Sylvain Bellemare, sound design
High-Rise – Mark Tildesley, production design
Jackie – Mica Levi, music
Jason Bourne – Gary Powell, stunt coordination
La La Land – Justin Hurwitz, music
Moonlight – Nat Sanders and Joi McMillon, editing
Rogue One: A Star Wars Story – Neal Scanlan, visual effects
Sing Street – Gary Clark and John Carney, music

Dilys Powell Award
Isabelle Huppert

References

2
2016 film awards
2016 in British cinema
2016 in London
January 2017 events in the United Kingdom